The 1989 Hong Kong Gold Cup was a professional non-ranking snooker tournament that took place in September 1989 in Hong Kong.

The tournament was a three-man tournament featuring Steve Davis, Alex Higgins and Jimmy White, each of whom played each other in a round robin match with the two best players advancing to the final, where Davis defeated Higgins 6–3.


Results

Group
Table

Results:
 Alex Higgins 3 – 2   Steve Davis
 Steve Davis 3 – 1  Jimmy White  
 Alex Higgins 3– 2  Jimmy White

Final

References

1989 in snooker
Sport in Hong Kong